Troisfontaines is a commune located in the department of Moselle, France.

Geography
The commune is composed of three villages: Troisfontaines, Biberkirch and Vallérysthal.

The municipality is located in the Rhine watershed within the Rhine-Meuse basin. It is drained by the Bièvre, the Krappenthal stream and the Schindelthal stream.

The old railroad line of the municipality has been converted into a bicycle path.

History
The territory of the commune was inhabited in prehistoric times and in Gallo-Roman times.

A glass factory, founded in 1699, was the origin of the creation of Troisfontaines.

The village was completely destroyed during the Thirty Years War and then repopulated in the 17th and 18th centuries by financial incentive (tax exemption for those who rebuilt a ruined house). Troisfontaines being at that time German-speaking, the efforts of repopulation focused on attracting German-speaking populations, such as Swiss, Bavarians, and Tyroleans.

A new, larger glass factory was established in 1707. In 1892, the community was connected to the railroad network.

The church only dates from the beginning of the 20th century. Previously Troisfontaines, as well as Hartzviller, were part of the parish of Biberkirch where the church was located.

On December 30, 1967, the commune of Troisfontaines merged with that of Biberkirch.

On December 26, 1999, Troisfontaines was hit by a storm that ravaged a large part of the forests, especially the one near Vallérysthal.

The village
The village has three fountains as its name implies: a monument is dedicated on the site of the Hoffe (founded in 2005-2006).

Economics

 SCHOTT VTF glassworks
 distillerie-du-castor
 glaziery
 Vallérysthal crystal maker
 distillery
 many shops
 bank
 business complex (nursery, medical offices, post office, ATM, daycare center)

Administration

Places and monuments

 Prehistoric stone tombs
 Gallo-Roman remains: fragments of stelae, bas-relief of Mercury, statue of an equestrian god
 Old mill of the Cross
 Vallérysthal crystal maker

Religious buildings
The church of Saint-Nicolas de Biberkirch  was built in 1719 and  renovated in 1836. It houses altars and an organ.

The Neo-Gothic church of Troisfontaines was built in 1914.

The municipality also houses the chapel of St. Augustine of Vallerysthal.

Leisure areas
A recreation area is located around the Vallérysthal's pond. It offers fishing and bowling, and includes a barbecue and picnic area.

A bike path of approximately  connects Troisfontaines to Sarrebourg.

STRV, Trial Club Valley of the Bievre, a round of the World Championship trials is held in Troisfontaines.

References

External links

 Website of the Commune of Troisfontaines

Communes of Moselle (department)